The following tables compare Enterprise bookmarking platforms.

General 
The table provides an overview of Enterprise Bookmarking platforms. The platforms listed refer to an application that is installed on a web server (usually requiring MySQL or another database and PHP, perl, Python, or some other language for webapps).

Date and content types 
This table lists the types of data that can be tagged.

Content enrichment capabilities 
Tags and metadata can be used to enrich previously described types of data and content. This table lists the default capabilities each platform provides.

Tag management capabilities 
Enterprise bookmarking tools differ from social bookmarking tools in the way that they often have to meet taxonomy constraints. Tag management capabilities are the uphill (e.g. faceted classification, predefined tags) and downhill gardening (e.g. tag renaming, moving, merging) abilities that can be put in place to manage the folksonomy generated from user tagging.

Platform and security capabilities 

Security abilities at the platform level:
 On-premises, refers to an application that is installed on a web server behind the corporate firewall.
 Hosted, refers to a centrally-hosted website that is outside the corporate firewall
 Encryption level, refers to the level of encryption enforced by the application server

Security abilities at the application level:
 Access permissions, refers to the ability to define a list of users who have access to the application.
 Information-level permissions, refers to the ability to define per data/content item (e.g. a document) its accessibility/visibility within the application (invisible, downloadable, etc.)
 Workspace-level permissions, refers to the ability to create team spaces with different accessibility/visibility settings.
 Role-level permissions, refers to the ability to assign roles to users (e.g. administrator, guest, workspace expert) which will also affect accessibility/visibility settings.

Server operating system support 
In the case of web applications, this describes the server OS.  For centrally-hosted websites that are proprietary, this is not applicable.  Any client OS can connect to a web service unless stated otherwise in a footnote.

See also 
 List of social bookmarking websites
 Comparison of reference management software
 List of social software

References

 
Enterprise bookmarking platforms
Enterprise bookmarking
Enterprise bookmarking platforms
Online bookmarking services